Pen-y-fai is a village in the county borough of Bridgend, Wales within the Bridgend electoral ward area and the community of Newcastle Higher. The ward population taken at the 2011 census was 2,447.

Amenities 

It has a population of about 2,000, one village shop, a chapel and All Saints parish church (a Church in Wales). It also has a village pub, The Pheasant, which was once an old farmhouse. Pen-y-fai was once a village for employees of the Llewellyn estate. There is a school called "Pen-y-fai CIW primary school" hence its location, that takes children from age 3 through to age 11. The school itself was in a poor state of repair until rebuilt by October 2013. There also is a private day nursery called "Old School House Nursery" named after and housed in the original, stone Church school, built by Colonel Llewellyn in 1898.

There are several playing fields in the village, the most recent of which was created as a part of a section 106 agreement between the council and the developers of the Cavendish Park housing estate. As a result of subsequent development, this field became "landlocked" between housing estates, with no vehicle access or parking, or indeed any facilities to allow the field to be used by local sports teams.

The village has a football (soccer) club, Pen-y-fai FC. It takes children from 6 to 16 years of age and plays as a member of Bridgend & District Football League, with teams in the mini-football and junior sections. Over 200 children are members of the club, making it one of the largest mini/junior clubs in the district. Pen-y-Fai is the only place in Wales that has the Dog's Trust dog rehoming kennels (NCDL).

Court Colman Manor, built in 1776, was the home of the Llewellyn family (of the Llewellyn estate). It eventually became an Edwardian gentlemen's residence, and it was later converted into a hotel. The late Vijay Bhagotra bought the hotel in 1999 and updated it. It is home to the Bokhara Brasserie, voted 'Best Indian Restaurant in Wales' at the British Curry Awards in 2008 and 2009.

References

External links
 
 www.geograph.co.uk : photos of Pen-y-fai and surrounding area

Villages in Bridgend County Borough